Club Sportif Étoile de Guinée, called CS Étoile de Guinée or simply Étoile de Guinée is a football club based in Conakry, Guinea. Founded in 1996, the team has promoted great talents such as Alhassane Bangoura, Naby Yattara, Kanfory Sylla, and Oumar Kalabane.

In 2003 they won the Guinée Coupe Nationale.

Car crash 191 
On 31. December 2019, nine players of the team died in a Bus crash in Mamou and 17 players were injured. The coach  collided with the bus of Wakriya AC, who the National players Alfred Kargbo of Sierra Leone at scene and Guinean Abubacar Camara died a day later in hospital.

Achievements

National titles
Guinée Coupe Nationale: 1
Winner: 2003

Tournoi Ruski Alumini: 1
Winner: 2002

Performance in CAF competitions
2004 CAF Confederation Cup: First round

Stadium
Currently the team plays at the Stade 28 Septembre.

Notes and references

External links
 Profile
 

Football clubs in Guinea
Sport in Conakry
Association football clubs established in 1996
1996 establishments in Guinea